Olav Gjelsvik (born 30 June 1956) is a Norwegian philosopher.

Born and raised in Røros, he graduated with a DPhil from Oxford University (Balliol College) in 1986, and has since been employed by the University of Oslo; from 1991 as an associate professor, and from 1994 as a full professor. He has published papers in journals and anthologies on topics in metaphysics, epistemology, philosophy of language, philosophy of science, philosophy of mind and action, and has also worked and published on the phenomenon of addiction. He has held many offices at the University of Oslo, been Chair of Philosophy in Oslo for many years, and is Director of CSMN. He is a member of the Norwegian Academy of Science and Letters.

References

External links 
 Staff Homepage at the University of Oslo

1956 births
Living people
20th-century Norwegian philosophers
21st-century Norwegian philosophers
Analytic philosophers
Philosophers of language
Alumni of Balliol College, Oxford
Academic staff of the University of Oslo
Members of the Norwegian Academy of Science and Letters
People from Røros